Clemente Serventi (born 7 September 1889, date of death unknown) was an Italian tennis player. He competed in the men's singles and doubles events at the 1924 Summer Olympics.

References

External links
 

1889 births
Year of death missing
Italian male tennis players
Olympic tennis players of Italy
Tennis players at the 1924 Summer Olympics
Tennis players from Rome